Jacob. Ruth Tucker (April 1, 1845 – February 16, 1926) was an American soldier who fought in the American Civil War. Tucker received his country's highest award for bravery during combat, the Medal of Honor. Tucker's medal was won for his heroism at the Third Battle of Petersburg in Virginia on April 1, 1865. He was honored with the award on April 22, 1871.

Tucker died in Baltimore, Maryland, in 1926.

Medal of Honor citation

See also
List of American Civil War Medal of Honor recipients: T–Z

References

1845 births
1926 deaths
American Civil War recipients of the Medal of Honor
People from Chester County, Pennsylvania
People of Maryland in the American Civil War
Union Army officers
United States Army Medal of Honor recipients
Military personnel from Pennsylvania